Kramer is a Dutch and Low German word for a small merchant, hawker, or retailer and is a common occupational surname. The word may refer to:

People
 Kramer (surname)
 Kramer (musician), a musician and record producer
 Cosmo Kramer, a fictional character from the American sitcom Seinfeld, usually referred to as just "Kramer"

Places 
 Kramer, California, U.S.
 Kramer, Indiana, U.S.
 Kramer, North Dakota, U.S.
 Kramer (Ochsenhausen), a district of the city Ochsenhausen, Baden-Württemberg, Germany
 Kramerspitz, a mountain in Bavaria, Germany

Companies
 Kramer Company, a German manufacturer of compact construction machines
 Kramer of New York (1943–1980), a jewelry company based in New York City
 Kramer Electronics, Ltd., an international electronics company
 Kramer Guitars, an American guitar company

Other uses
 5715 Kramer, an asteroid
 Kramer graph, a two-stroke engine port area graph
 Kramer vs. Kramer, a 1979 American film, Academy Award winner for Best Picture
 Kramer station, a Capital MetroRail station in Austin, Texas
 Raymond C. and Mildred Kramer House, in New York City

See also
 Cramer (disambiguation)
 Kraemer (disambiguation)
 Krammer, body of water in  Volkerak, Netherlands
 Kremer (disambiguation)